Abqah (also Romanized as Ābqah and Āb Qeh; also known as Ābgheh, Āgha, and Aqah) is a village in Karat Rural District, in the Central District of Taybad County, Razavi Khorasan Province, Iran. At the 2006 census, its population was 2,029, in 391 families.

See also 

 List of cities, towns and villages in Razavi Khorasan Province

References 

Populated places in Taybad County